A list of films produced by the Marathi language film industry based in Maharashtra in the year 1970.

1970 Releases
A list of Marathi films released in 1970.

References

Lists of 1970 films by country or language
1970 in Indian cinema
1970